WOW Hits 2014 is a two-disc compilation album composed of some of the biggest hits on Christian radio in 2013. This disc features 33 songs (39 on the deluxe edition).

On March 21, 2014, the album was certified gold by the RIAA with shipments of over 500,000 copies in the US.

Track listing

Chart performance

Certifications

References

External links
 

2013 compilation albums
2014